Kenmil Place in Kentucky was listed on the National Register of Historic Places in 2009.  Although the house was Italianate in style until its renovation in 1923, it is significant for its Classical Revival style, popular in Kentucky from 1895 until 1950.  The building's Italianate incarnation was built in 1869, and the house was known as Brighton.

It was listed on the National Register of Historic Places in February, 2009.

The property was the Highlighted Property of the Week when the National Park Service released its weekly list of February 20, 2009.

References

Neoclassical architecture in Kentucky
Houses completed in 1869
National Register of Historic Places in McCracken County, Kentucky
Houses in McCracken County, Kentucky
Houses on the National Register of Historic Places in Kentucky
1869 establishments in Kentucky